The members of the 22nd General Assembly of Newfoundland were elected in the Newfoundland general election held in May 1909. The general assembly sat from 1909 to 1913.

The Newfoundland People's Party led by Edward P. Morris formed the government.

Francis J. Morris served as speaker until 1910 when William Warren succeeded Morris as speaker.

Sir Ralph Champneys Williams served as governor of Newfoundland.

Members of the Assembly 
The following members were elected to the assembly in 1904:

Notes:

By-elections 
By-elections were held to replace members for various reasons:

Notes:

References 

Terms of the General Assembly of Newfoundland and Labrador